My Wife and Kids is an American television sitcom that aired on ABC from March 28, 2001, to May 17, 2005. The series was produced by Touchstone Television in association with Wayans Bros. Entertainment and Impact Zone Productions.

The series stars Damon Wayans (also a creator alongside veteran television writer/producer Don Reo) as Michael Kyle, the patriarch of an African-American family. 123 episodes were produced.

Synopsis
The Kyle family is a upper middle class African-American family living in Stamford, Connecticut where Michael Kyle, a loving husband and caring father of three, owns and operates a trucking company. He and his wife, Jay, raise their children in a unique, but unorthodox parenting style as he disciplines them in his own creative way. Despite his chaotic upbringings, Michael always means well to be there for his wife and children with his sense of humor.

Episodes

Cast

Main
Damon Wayans as Michael Kyle Sr.
Tisha Campbell-Martin as Janet Marie "Jay" Kyle
George O. Gore II as Michael "Junior" Kyle Jr.
Jazz Raycole (season 1) and Jennifer Nicole Freeman (seasons 2-5) as Claire Kyle
Parker McKenna Posey as Kady Kyle
Meagan Good (season 3) and Brooklyn Sudano (seasons 4-5) as Vanessa Scott-Kyle
 Noah Gray-Cabey as Franklin Aloysius Mumford III

Recurring
 Ella Joyce as Jasmine Scott (seasons 4-5)
 Lester Speight as Calvin Scott (seasons 4–5)
 Phil Reeves as Dr. William Parks Klieger (seasons 1–2)
 RuDee Sade as Erica Washington (seasons 1–2)
 Cara Mia Wayans as Shante Bre (seasons 1–2)
 Damon Wayans Jr. as John (seasons 2–4)
 Liliana Mumy as Rachel McNamara (seasons 2–4)
 Jessica Sara as Melissa (seasons 2–3)
 DeRay Davis as R.J. (seasons 2–4)
 Brian Holtzman as Brian (seasons 3–4)
 Todd Lynn as Todd (seasons 3–4)
 Sean Whalen as Larry (season 4)
 Andrew McFarlane as Tony Jeffers

Home media
Lionsgate Home Entertainment has released the first two seasons of My Wife and Kids on DVD in Region 1.

Reception

Season ratings

Accolades

References

External links

 

2000s American black sitcoms
2001 American television series debuts
2005 American television series endings
American Broadcasting Company original programming
English-language television shows
Teenage pregnancy in television
Television series about children
Television series about families
Television series about marriage
Television series by ABC Studios
Television series created by Don Reo
Television shows filmed in Los Angeles
Television shows set in Connecticut